Manifest Destiny is the second album by The Dictators and their first after switching to the Asylum label. Trouser Press praised the album as "another helping of brilliant Shernoff originals".

Track listing

Personnel
The Dictators
Handsome Dick Manitoba – lead vocals
Ross "The Boss" Friedman – lead guitar, 12-string guitar
Scott "Top Ten" Kempner – rhythm guitar
Andy Shernoff – keyboards, lead and backing vocals
Mark "The Animal" Mendoza – bass guitar
Richie Teeter – drums, backing vocals, lead vocals on "Sleeping with the TV On" and "Hey Boys"

Additional musicians
Petronius Wood – additional keyboards

Production
Murray Krugman, Sandy Pearlman – producers
John Jansen – engineer
Andy Abrams, Corky Stasiak, Gray Russell, Jay Krugman, Rod O'Brien, Thom Panunzio – assistant engineers
Steve L. Schenck – production coordinator
Anne Garner, Roni Hoffman, Veronica Drew Ink - art direction, design
Eric Meola - photography

References

The Dictators albums
1977 albums
Asylum Records albums
Albums produced by Murray Krugman
Albums produced by Sandy Pearlman